The 2001 North Queensland Cowboys season was the 7th in the club's history. Coached by Tim Sheens and captained by Paul Bowman, they competed in the NRL's 2001 Telstra Premiership.

Following a mid-season club taker over by News Limited, Sheens resigned as head coach on 25 May and was replaced by his assistant, Murray Hurst.

Season summary 
2001 was another season that started with high hopes but ended in disaster for the club. It got off to an awful start before a ball was even kicked, when club captain Tim Brasher injured his knee in the pre-season, resulting in a complete reconstruction and ruling him out for the year. The club struggled to replace the outgoing Scott Prince in the halves and Brasher at fullback, winning just two games after 11 games to sit in last place on the ladder.

Their Round 6 win over the Wests Tigers was shrouded in controversy when Tigers' winger John Hopoate, in an attempt to unsettle several of his opponents, inserted his finger in three players' anuses, the first occurring during the seventh minute of play. Hopoate was subsequently suspended for 12 games.

Following the Round 11 loss to the Canterbury Bulldogs, Tim Sheens took a period of stress-leave and later resigned from the club on 25 May after News Limited took full control of the club. He was replaced by his assistant, former Tongan national team coach Murray Hurst.

The change did little to alter the fortunes of the side, winning just four of their last 15 games. A win in Round 26 over the Warriors in Auckland spared the side of a second straight wooden spoon, finishing ahead of the Penrith Panthers on points differential.

Despite the issues on and off the field, there were a number of bright spots throughout the season, including the emergence of Matthew Bowen. Bowen, who made his debut in Round 2, would go onto play 270 games, scoring 130 tries, and representing Australia and Queensland during his 13-year career at the club. Another positive was the selection of four players in the victorious Queensland squad for the 2001 State of Origin series, the most for the club at the time. All four players selected (Paul Bowman, John Buttigieg, John Doyle and Nathan Fien) were local products who came through the junior ranks of the club.

Milestones 
 Round 1: Tim Maddison and Lee Oudenryn made their debuts for the club.
 Round 1: Matthew Bowen and Trent Leis made their NRL debuts.
 Round 4: Adam Nable made his debut for the club.
 Round 4: Tarin Bradford and Chris Sheppard made their NRL debuts.
 Round 7: Chris Muckert made his NRL debut.
 Round 10: Micheal Luck made his NRL debut.
 Round 11: Peter Jones became the first player to play 100 games for the club.
 Round 13: John Doyle played his 50th game for the club.
 Round 19: George Gatis made his NRL debut.
 Round 13: Josh Hannay played his 50th game for the club.
 Round 25: Danny Moore made his debut for the club.

Squad List

Squad Movement

2001 Gains

2001 Losses

Ladder

Fixtures

Regular season

Statistics 

Source:

Representatives 
The following players played a representative match in 2001.

Honours

Club 
 Player of the Year: Glenn Morrison
 Players' Player: Glenn Morrison
 Club Person of the Year: Peter Jones

Feeder Clubs

NSWRL First Division 
  North Queensland Cowboys - 4th, lost semi final

References 

North Queensland Cowboys seasons
North Queensland Cowboys season